Serge Diantantu (4 May 1960 – 1 June 2022) was a Congolese comic book artist, caricaturist, and writer.

Works

Comic books
Simon Kimbangu - Tome 1 : Simon Kimbangu (2004)
La petite Djily et mère Mamou (2008)
Mémoire de l'esclavage - Tome 1 : Bulambemba (2010)
Mémoire de l'esclavage - Tome 2 : En naviguant vers les Indes (2011)
Mémoire de l'esclavage - Tome 3 : L'embarquement de bois d'ébène (2012)
Mémoire de l'esclavage - Tome 4 : Ile de Gorée (2014)
Mémoire de l'esclavage - Tome 5 : Colonies des Antilles et de l'Océan (2015)
Félix Éboué, le héros de la France Libre (2016)
Samantha et Ségou - Tome 1 : Samantha et Ségou visitent la Guyane (2020)

Books, essays
Femme noire, je vous salue (2008)
Femme noire d'Afrique, d'Amérique et des Antilles (2011)
Homme noir d'Afrique, d'Amérique et des Antilles (2012)

Illustrations
Il fut un jour à Gorée (2006)

Distinctions
Prix de la bande dessinée engagée à Lyon (2008)
Prix Fetkann! de la jeunesse (2013)

References

External links
 Lambiek Comiclopedia biography.

1960 births
2022 deaths
Democratic Republic of the Congo comics artists
Democratic Republic of the Congo male writers
People from Kongo Central